The 2023 Canada Winter Games, officially known as the XXVIII Canada Games, (or informally as PEI 2023) is a Canadian multi-sport event being hosted across Prince Edward Island, from February 18, 2023, to March 5, 2023.

Bidding
As part of the rotation of Canada Games hosts, the Northwest Territories with (Yellowknife) were scheduled to host the games for the first time ever. However, in September 2016, The Northwest Territories and Prince Edward Island agreed to swap bidding years (with the former now eligible to bid for 2031). In November 2018, the island officially won its bid to host the games.

Venues
A total of 18 venues (16 in Prince Edward Island, one each in Nova Scotia and New Brunswick) will stage the competitions. The venue in New Brunswick was chosen to host the alpine and freestyle skiing events, as there is no downhill mountain available in Prince Edward Island. Meanwhile the speed skating oval from the 2011 Canada Winter Games will be used as there are no suitable facilities in Prince Edward Island.

New Brunswick

Nova Scotia

Prince Edward Island

Sports
A total of 175 events in 21 sports will be contested at the games. An initial group of sports was named on January 19, 2017. The sports of karate was selected by the organizing committee as the final sport. Fencing (for the first time since 2013) and table tennis were added later by the CGC, after artistic swimming was moved to the summer sports program. Women's boxing, mixed doubles curling and karate will make their Canada Games debut.

 
 
 
 
 
 
 
 
 
 
 
 Artistic gymnastics (14)
 Trampoline (5)

Participating provinces and territories
All 13 of Canada's provinces and territories competed.

Marketing

Mascot
Wowkwis (whoa-quis; red fox) is the 2023 Canada Games mascot.

Medal standings

Medallists

Archery

Alpine skiing

Para

Badminton

Biathlon

Boxing

Curling

Cross-country skiing

Para

Fencing

Figure skating

Special Olympics

Freestyle skiing

Gymnastics

Artistic

Trampoline

Hockey

Judo

Karate

Ringette

Short track speed skating

Snowboarding

Squash

Speed skating

Table tennis

Wheelchair basketball

References

2023 Canada Winter Games
Canada Games
Canada Winter Games
Canada Winter Games
Canada Winter Games
Sports competitions in Prince Edward Island
2023 in Canadian sports
2023 in Prince Edward Island
Ice hockey
Ringette
2023 in women's sport